Queensville is an unincorporated community in Geneva Township, Jennings County, Indiana.

History
Queensville was originally called Lynnville, and under the latter name was laid out in 1848. In 1855 the village adopted the name Queensville.

A post office was established at Queensville in 1847, and remained in operation until it was discontinued in 1927.

Geography

References

Unincorporated communities in Jennings County, Indiana
Unincorporated communities in Indiana